Jello salad is an American salad made with flavored gelatin, fruit, and sometimes grated carrots or (more rarely) other vegetables. Other ingredients may include cottage cheese, cream cheese, marshmallows, nuts, or pretzels. Jello salads were popular in the 1960s and are now considered retro.

Because of its many elements, the result has speckled bits of interior color against a colored gelatin background, and so the dish can be appreciated for its colorful visual appeal. For example, a jello salad might have green from a lime-flavored gelatin, brown from nuts or pretzels, white from bits of cottage cheese, and red and orange from fruit cocktail. Therefore, it has a "salad appearance" (small pieces of food) although it's held firm in gelatin (like aspic). The "salad" theme is more pronounced in variants containing mayonnaise, or another salad dressing. When the dish has plain gelatin instead of sweetened gelatin, the use of vegetables is more common (e.g. tomato aspic).

History 
The name comes from the genericization of the brand name Jell-O, a common gelatin product in the United States. The origins of jello salad can be traced back to a dish called perfection salad (c. 1904) by Mrs. John E. Cook of New Castle, Pennsylvania, which won third prize in a Better Homes and Gardens recipe contest. Strawberry-pretzel and mandarin orange remain popular in the Midwest which are sweet alternatives for the original recipe. 

Jello salads are a common feature of US communal meals such as potlucks, most probably because they are inexpensive and easy to prepare. The salad has a strong regional presence in Utah and surrounding states (the Mormon Corridor), especially among members of the Church of Jesus Christ of Latter-day Saints. In Utah, where Jell-O is the official state snack, jello salad is commonly available in local restaurants such as Chuck-A-Rama. In Canada, a traditional Newfoundland cold plate commonly includes a variation on jello salad, though more commonly known as a 'jelly' salad.

See also
 Aspic, a savory gelatin dish
 Seafoam salad, a type of jello salad
Frogeye salad, a sweet pasta salad
Watergate salad, dessert salad with pistachio pudding
Ambrosia salad, a fruit salad
 "Lime Jello Marshmallow Cottage Cheese Surprise", a humorous song about a specific type of gelatin salad (1980)

References

External links
Jell-O Salad with cottage cheese recipe

Utah cuisine
Pennsylvania culture
Desserts
American salads
Jello salads